Silerio is a surname. Notable people with the surname include:

Guadalupe Silerio (born 1971), Mexican politician
Maximiliano Silerio Esparza, Mexican politician